Fellowship Christian School is a private Christian school located in Roswell, Georgia, United States. It is located on Woodstock Road off of Georgia State Route 92. Neighboring Fellowship Christian are Roswell High School and Blessed Trinity Catholic High School. The uniqueness of Fellowship Christian is its Biblical foundation. The school's primary goals are to introduce Biblical truths, and help their students in whole-person development. As of the end of the 2014 school year, Fellowship Christian School has more than 800 students, and it is accredited by the Southern Association of Colleges and Schools (SACS), Association of Christian Schools International (ACSI), Evangelical Council for Financial Accountability (ECFA), and Southern Association of Independent Schools (SAIS).

History
Fellowship Christian School was founded in 1986.  Initially, it served as an elementary and middle school. It wasn't until 1993 that Fellowship Christian began offering a high school education. In 2007 the kindergarten program was expanded.

Location
The address of Fellowship Christian School is:

10965 Woodstock Road
Roswell, Georgia 30075

Academics
Fellowship Christian School's main academic goal is to prepare its students for college. The school tries to integrate Biblical teachings into every academic area. One of its greatest strengths is the AP program, including classes in Art, Biology, Physics, Chemistry, English, Government, History, Math, and Foreign Language.

STEM
Fellowship Christian School offers a STEM program focused on hands-on design activities in engineering and computer technologies.  Several targeted pathways are offered to high school students pursuing studies in mechanical, electrical, aeronautical, architectural, or computer engineering.

Fine arts
Fellowship Christian School offers a wide variety of fine arts. They provide fine arts for the elementary, middle, and high school. The high school offers art, chorus, yearbook, media production, and web design.

Athletics
Fellowship Christian Paladins participate in athletics at all levels, but the high school teams compete in the Georgia High School Association, also known as the GHSA. The GHSA has Fellowship Christian School in Class A, Region 7, Division A.

Fellowship offers high school baseball, boys' and girls' basketball, cheerleading, cross country, football, wrestling, golf, softball, boys' and girls' soccer, boys' and girls' tennis, track and field, volleyball and lacrosse.  Boys' and girls' soccer and volleyball are the most historically dominant teams.

At the beginning of the 2013–2014 school year, Bryan Linder was named the Athletic Director.

References

External links
 FCS official website
 GHSA

1986 establishments in Georgia (U.S. state)
Christian schools in Georgia (U.S. state)
Educational institutions established in 1986
Private elementary schools in Georgia (U.S. state)
Private high schools in Georgia (U.S. state)
Private middle schools in Georgia (U.S. state)
Roswell, Georgia
Schools in Fulton County, Georgia